Acartauchenius minor is a species of sheet weaver. Endemic to Italy, it was described by Millidge in 1979.

References

Linyphiidae
Spiders of Europe
Spiders described in 1979